Tornike Zoidze (born May 10, 1996) is a Georgian Rugby Union player. His position is Lock and he currently plays for RC Academy Tbilisi in the Didi 10 and the Georgia national U20 team.

References

1996 births
Living people
Rugby union players from Georgia (country)
Rugby union locks
ASM Clermont Auvergne players